Family Katta is an Indian Marathi-language comedy-drama film directed by Chandrakant Kulkarni and produced by Vandana Gupte. Released in India on 7 October 2016, the film has a star cast of more than 10 actors which includes Dilip Prabhavalkar, Vandana Gupte, Alok Rajwade, Gauri Nalawade, Kiran Karmarkar, Prateeksha Lonkar, Sachin Deshpande, Sulekha Talwalkar, Sanjay Khapre, Sai Tamhankar and Aadesh Shrivastava. The plot revolves around an elderly couple Madhukar Sabnis (Dilip Prabhavalkar) and Malati Sabnis (Vandana Gupte) based in Pune who plan a reunion on their 50th wedding anniversary to resolve the differences between their children and grandchildren.

Plot 

An elderly couple Madhukar Sabnis aka Bhai (Dilip Prabhavalkar) and Malati Sabnis (Vandana Gupte) based in Pune is planning to celebrate their 50th wedding anniversary at their house by throwing a small party over there to organise a reunion which is compulsory for all of their family members. This is their yet another effort of getting their children and grandchildren together. Their children and grandchildren are located in different cities and have lost contact over time due to unresolved issues of the past. Meanwhile, Bhai and Malati are shown carrying away daily household chores while anticipating and getting things ready for their occasion. There is also a light humour arising out of their arguments over small issues in their day-to-day life. All of their family members also start getting introduced: their first son is Nishikant Sabnis (Kiran Karmarkar) who lives with his wife Sujata Sabnis (Prateeksha Lonkar) and son Siddharth Sabnis (Alok Rajwade) in Mumbai; their second son is Deepak Sabnis (Sachin Deshpande) who lives with his wife Veena Sabnis (Sulekha Talwalkar) and daughter Tanvi Sabnis (Gauri Nalawade); their third son is Viju Sabnis (Sanjay Khapre) who is unmarried; and their daughter is Manju Sabnis (Sai Tamhankar) who lives with her husband Akhilesh (Aadesh Shrivastava) who is a man of a different caste and a different age.   
Finally, the day of Bhai and Malati's 50th wedding anniversary approaches when they are shown sharing a private moment and remembering all the good memories of their past years in the early morning hours. Meanwhile, Siddharth and Tanvi create a WhatsApp group named "Family Katta" to make all the family members meet each other on the way and go to their destination together against both of their parents' wishes.

The film takes a shocking and tragedic turn in its second-half with the sudden death of Bhai in his room due to heart failure. Malati is devastated on discovering this but she decides to keep this a secret as she does not want the efforts put by her and Bhai to bring all their family members together to go in vain. After all the family members' arrival, Malati hides Bhai's dead body in his bedroom and lies to everyone that he is resting in it. However, thinking that he is still disapproving her marriage, Manju goes in Bhai's bedroom along with Akhilesh to confront him over this and they discover that he is already dead but do not reveal this to anyone. Meanwhile, all the other family members are delighted with the reunion and share some light moments as they are unaware of the situation. Later, Malati somehow covers Bhai's dead body and brings it outside in his old wheelchair. Thinking that he is ill, all the family members take a selfie with Malati and Bhai's covered dead body, just after Malati plays a recording which has the timeline of the Sabnis family narrated by Bhai some days ago. In two scenes, Malati is shown imagining an alive Bhai talking to her and all the family members. After Siddharth and Tanvi go out and buy a cake for Bhai and Malati's 50th wedding anniversary, all the other family members start arguing with each other at home due still unresolved issues of the past. Malati overhears this argument and she reveals Bhai's death to everybody in an outburst which devastates them. Everybody then feel guilty for their behaviour with Bhai and they apologise to Malati, saying that they will never leave each other alone. The film ends with Siddharth sending the Sabnis family members' last photograph on the Family Katta WhatsApp group and typing on it that the real death of Bhai took place only after he met all of them and celebrated his 50th wedding anniversary along with them.

Cast 
 Dilip Prabhavalkar as Madhukar Sabnis (Bhai)
 Vandana Gupte as Malati Sabnis 
 Alok Rajwade as Siddharth Sabnis (Bhai and Malati's grandson)
 Gauri Nalawade as Tanvi Sabnis (Bhai and Malati's granddaughter)
 Kiran Karmarkar as Nishikant Sabnis (Bhai and Malati's first son)
 Prateeksha Lonkar as Sujata Sabnis (Bhai and Malati's first daughter-in-law)
 Sachin Deshpande as Deepak Sabnis (Bhai and Malati's second son)
 Sulekha Talwalkar as Veena Sabnis (Bhai and Malati's second daughter-in-law)
 Sanjay Khapre as Viju Sabnis (Bhai and Malati's third son)
 Sai Tamhankar as Manju Sabnis (Bhai and Malati's daughter)
 Aadesh Shrivastava as Akhilesh Srivastava (Bhai and Malati's son-in-law)
 Bharati Achrekar as Malati's sister (Special Appearance)

Soundtrack

 
The soundtrack of Family Katta consists of just one song, Ek Sohlaa Nirala , which was sung by Aanandi Joshi, composed by Mangesh Dhakade and written by Dasoo.

Reception 
The Times of India rated the film at three and a half stars, stating that "In an industry that is busy following trends most of the times, Family Katta comes as a fresh detour from the usual fare." Loksatta also reviewed the movie,. as did the Pune Mirror, which stated that it had a "strong emotional core". The movie received three and half stars by ABP Majha stating this is a Celebration that puts Xrays on Relationships.

Box office
The film's six day box office collection was approx Rs. 1.53 Crores.

Accolades

References

External links
 

2016 films
2010s Marathi-language films